Turbonilla leuca is a species of sea snail, a marine gastropod mollusk in the family Pyramidellidae, the pyrams and their allies.

Description
The length of the shell measures 4.5 mm.

Distribution
This species occurs in the Atlantic Ocean off the Bermudas.

References

External links
 To Biodiversity Heritage Library (3 publications)
 To Encyclopedia of Life
 To World Register of Marine Species

leuca
Gastropods described in 1899